The lower end of the hippocampus is enlarged, and presents two or three rounded elevations or digitations which give it a paw-like appearance, and hence it is named the pes hippocampi (pes meaning foot) or pes hippocampi major

References

External links
 https://web.archive.org/web/20110722072202/http://web.sc.itc.keio.ac.jp/anatomy/Rauber-Kopsch/web/abb2/png144/440.png

Hippocampus (brain)